Nebbia is an Italian surname meaning mist or fog. Notable people with this surname include:

 Cesare Nebbia (1536–1622), Italian painter
 Leo Nebbia, plaintiff in the Nebbia v. New York case
 Litto Nebbia (born 1948), Argentinian singer-songwriter

See also